Bluffton Public Schools is a school district in Northwest Ohio, United States. The school district has an open enrollment policy, meaning that students outside the district can enroll in Bluffton Public Schools, though Bluffton Public Schools primarily serves students who live in the city of Bluffton, located in Allen and Hancock counties.

Grades 9-12
Bluffton High School

Grades 6-8
Bluffton Middle School

Grades K-5
Bluffton Elementary Schools

External links
District Website

School districts in Ohio
Education in Allen County, Ohio
Education in Hancock County, Ohio
School District